Per Hage (October 9, 1935 - July 25, 2004), was an American anthropologist known for his kinship studies with mathematician Frank Harary. They researched the connections between anthropology and mathematics.

Books with Harary
 Structural Models in Anthropology (1984) 
 Island Networks: Communication, Kinship, and Classification Structures in Oceania (2007) 
 Exchange in Oceania: A Graph Theoretic Analysis (1991)

References 

1935 births
2004 deaths